Ultimate Comics: New Ultimates is a comic book limited series published by Marvel Comics that began in March 2010 as part of Marvel's "Ultimate Comics" imprint.  The series was written by Jeph Loeb, writer of Ultimates 3 and Ultimatum. Members of the New Ultimates include Captain America, Thor, Valkyrie, Hawkeye, Black Panther, Shanna, Ka-Zar, and Princess Zarda.

Synopsis

Eight months after the Ultimatum Wave, The Defenders, having recently acquired superpowers, attack Iron Man and Hawkeye at the Triskelion facility. After a brief fight, Captain America, Zarda, and Valkyrie arrive to help. The Defenders then teleport away, stealing the great Mjöllnir from Valkyrie in the process. Meanwhile, in Central Park, Shanna, Ka-Zar, and the Black Panther encounter Loki as he returns to Earth with the Enchantress and a swarm of monsters.  At the same time, Hela offers Thor a return to Earth from Valhalla in exchange for a son. It is also revealed that Tony Stark and Carol Danvers, director of SHIELD, have become romantically involved.

Collected editions
Ultimate Comics: New Ultimates has been collected into the following trade paperback:

See also
The Ultimates (comic book)
The Ultimates 2
The Ultimates 3
Ultimate Comics: Avengers

References

Ultimates